The 9th National Congress of the Kuomintang was the ninth national congress of the Kuomintang (KMT), held on 12 to 22 November 1963 in Taipei, Taiwan Province, Nationalist China.

See also
 Kuomintang

References

1963 conferences
1963 in Taiwan
National Congresses of the Kuomintang
Politics of Taiwan